Șinteu is a commune in Bihor County, Crișana, Romania with a population of 1,021 people. It is composed of four villages: Huta Voivozi (Stará Huta; Almaszeghuta), Socet (Huta Sočet; Forduló), Șinteu and Valea Târnei (Židáreň; Hármaspatak). 98.4% of the inhabitants are Slovaks, and 98.6% of them are Roman Catholic.

References

Communes in Bihor County
Localities in Crișana
Slovak communities in Romania